"Mr. Lonely" is a song co-written and recorded by American singer Bobby Vinton, backed by Robert Mersey and his Orchestra.  The song was first released on Vinton's 1962 album, Roses Are Red.

Background
Vinton began writing the song in the late 1950s, while serving in the Army. The song describes a soldier who is sent overseas and has no communication with his home. The singer laments his condition and wishes for someone to talk with.

The single of Vinton's recording was released just as the Vietnam War was escalating and many soldiers were experiencing a similar situation. Vinton's version was noted for his sobbing emotionally during the second verse. Vinton and Gene Allan later re-teamed to compose "Coming Home Soldier", which reached No. 11 on the Billboard Hot 100 in January 1967.

Although he turned out to be Epic Records' best selling artist of the 1960s, the record company initially did not display confidence in Vinton. This song was included on his first vocal album, Roses Are Red, but it was not released as a single at that time. Vinton wanted it to be the followup to his first hit, "Roses Are Red," but Epic's executives chose the very similar "Rain Rain Go Away" instead, giving "Mr. Lonely" to Buddy Greco, whom they were grooming as their next big superstar.

Greco's version reached No. 64 on the Billboard Hot 100 chart on November 10, 1962. After Vinton heard Greco's version on the radio, the executives confessed to him that they felt he was more of a musician and songwriter than a singer. However, in the following months, Vinton's continued success as a vocalist made them reconsider their position.

Many months later, when Epic gave Vinton the choice of which song should be the twelfth and final selection for his greatest-hits album, he chose "Mr. Lonely". Following its inclusion on the album, many radio disc jockeys started to play the track—particularly those who remembered Buddy Greco's version and how Vinton had been prevented from releasing it as a single.

With the song's newfound popularity came a rise in demand for Vinton's version to be released as a single. "Mr. Lonely" became one of Vinton's signature songs and a favorite with servicemen around the world. Epic subsequently built an entire album release around "Mr. Lonely" when it became a hit as a single.

In 1966, Vinton recorded a sequel in which the singer comes home safe, "Coming Home Soldier."

Chart history
The song spent 15 weeks on the Billboard Hot 100, reaching No. 1 on December 12, 1964, while reaching No. 3 on Billboard's Middle-Road Singles chart. In Canada, the song reached No. 1 on RPM's "Top 40 & 5" chart. The song also reached No. 2 on New Zealand's "Lever Hit Parade", No. 8 in Australia, and entered into the top 3 in South Africa.

In 1973, the song was re-released as a single, and it reached No. 24 in Flanders.

Johnny Hallyday version (in French) 

In 1965, French rockstar Johnny Hallyday did a version of the song called "Quand revient la nuit", which became a success in France.

Charts

References

Bobby Vinton songs
1960s ballads
1962 songs
1964 singles
Songs about loneliness
Songs about the military
Billboard Hot 100 number-one singles
Songs written by Bobby Vinton
RPM Top Singles number-one singles
Epic Records singles
Internet memes